The Zhengde Emperor (26 October 149120 April 1521) was the 11th Emperor of the Ming dynasty, reigned from 1505 to 1521.

Born Zhu Houzhao, he was the Hongzhi Emperor's eldest son. Zhu Houzhao took the throne at only 14 with the era name "Zhengde", meaning "right virtue" or "rectification of virtue". He was known for favoring eunuchs such as Liu Jin and became infamous for his childlike behavior. He eventually died at age 29 from an illness he contracted after drunkenly falling off a boat into the Yellow River. He left behind no sons and was succeeded by his first cousin Zhu Houcong.

Early years
Zhu Houzhao was made crown prince at a very early age and because his father did not take up any other concubines, Zhu did not have to contend with other princes for the throne. (His younger brother died in infancy.) The prince was thoroughly educated in Confucian literature and he excelled in his studies. Many of the Hongzhi Emperor's ministers expected that Zhu Houzhao would become a benevolent and brilliant emperor like his father.

Reign as emperor

Zhu Houzhao ascended the throne as the Zhengde Emperor and was married to his Empress at the age of 14. Unlike his father, the Zhengde Emperor was not interested in ruling or his Empress and disregarded most state affairs. His actions have been considered reckless, foolish or pointless. There are many instances where he showed a lack of responsibility.

The Zhengde Emperor took up a luxurious and prodigal lifestyle and indulged himself in women. It was said that he liked to frequent brothels and even created palaces called "Bao Fang" (豹房; literally "The Leopards' Chamber") outside the Forbidden City in Beijing initially to house exotic animals such as tigers and leopards for his amusement and then later used to house beautiful women for his personal enjoyment. He also met Wang Mantang, one of his favorite consorts at a Bao Fang. On one occasion he was badly mauled while hunting tigers, and could not appear in court audiences for a month. On another occasion he burned down his palace by storing gunpowder in the courtyards during the lantern festival. His harem was so overfilled that many women starved to death due to lack of supplies.

For months at a time he would live outside the Forbidden City or travel around the country with heavy expenditures being paid from the Ming government's coffers. While being urged to return to the palace and attend to governmental matters, the Zhengde Emperor would refuse to receive all his ministers and ignored all their petitions. He also sanctioned the rise of eunuchs around him. One particular Liu Jin, leader of the Eight Tigers, was notorious for taking advantage of the young emperor and squandered immense amount of silver and valuables. The diverted funds were about 36 million pounds of gold and silver. There was even rumor of a plot that Liu Jin had intended to murder the emperor and place his own grandnephew on the throne. Liu Jin's plot was ultimately discovered, and he was executed in 1510. However, the rise of corrupt enunchs continued throughout the Zhengde Emperor's reign. There was also an uprising led by the Prince of Anhua and another uprising led by the Prince of Ning. The Prince of Anhua was the Zhengde Emperor's great-granduncle, while the Prince of Ning was his granduncle.

In time, the Zhengde Emperor became notorious for his childish behaviour as well as abusing his power as emperor. For instance, he set up a staged commercial district inside his palace and ordered all his ministers, eunuchs, soldiers and servants of the palace to dress up and act as merchants or street vendors while he walked through the scene pretending to be a commoner. Any unwilling participants, especially the ministers (who viewed it as degrading and an insult), would be punished or removed from their post.

Then in 1517, the Zhengde Emperor gave himself an alter ego named Zhu Shou (朱壽) so he could relinquish his imperial duties and send himself off on an expedition to the north to repel raiding expeditions several tens of thousands strong led by Dayan Khan. He met the enemy outside the city of Yingzhou and defeated them in a major battle by surrounding them. For a long period of time after this battle, the Mongols did not launch a raiding expedition into Ming territory. Then again in 1519, the Zhengde Emperor led another expedition to Jiangxi province to the south to quell the Prince of Ning rebellion by a powerful prince known as Zhu Chenhao who had bribed many people in the emperor's cabinet. He arrived only to discover that the revolt had already been put down by Wang Yangming, a local administrative officer. Frustrated at not being able to lead his troops to victory, the Zhengde Emperor's advisor suggested they release the prince in order to capture him again. In January 1521, the Zhengde Emperor had the rebel Prince of Ning executed in Tongzhou, an event that was recorded even by the Portuguese embassy to China.

Relations with Muslims

The Zhengde Emperor was fascinated by foreigners and invited many Muslims to serve as advisors, eunuchs, and envoys at his court. Works of art such as porcelain from his court contained Islamic inscriptions in Arabic or Persian.

Khataynameh, a travelogue written by the Central Asian merchant ʿAli Akbar Khata'i, records that there was a grand mosque in Beijing and the Emperor used to visit and pray.

An edict against slaughtering pigs led to speculation that the Zhengde Emperor adopted Islam due to his use of Muslim eunuchs who commissioned the production of porcelain with Persian and Arabic inscriptions in white and blue. It is unknown who really was behind the anti-pig slaughter edict.

The Zhengde Emperor preferred foreign Muslim women, having many relationships with them.

According to Bret Hinsch in the book Passions of the cut sleeve: the male homosexual tradition in China, the Zhengde Emperor had an alleged homosexual relationship with a Muslim leader from Hami, named Sayyid Husain, who served as the overseer in Hami during the Ming-Turpan border wars, although no evidence supporting this claim exists in Chinese sources.

Dark Affliction
Prior to the death of the Zhengde Emperor in early 1521, rumours about a mysterious group of creatures collectively called Dark Afflictions circulated the capital. Their attacks caused much unrest, because they randomly attacked people at night, causing wounds with their claws. The Minister for War asked the emperor to write an imperial edict proclaiming local security troops would arrest all those who frightened other people. The threat brought a sudden end to the spread of the stories.

Contact with Europe

The first direct European contacts with China occurred during the reign of the Zhengde Emperor. In several initial missions commissioned by Afonso de Albuquerque of Portuguese Malacca, the Portuguese explorers Jorge Álvares and Rafael Perestrello landed in southern China and traded with the Chinese merchants of Tuen Mun and Guangzhou. In 1513 their king, Manuel I of Portugal, sent Fernão Pires de Andrade and Tomé Pires to formally open relations between the main court at Beijing and Lisbon, capital of Portugal. Although the Zhengde Emperor gave the Portuguese ambassador his blessing while touring Nanjing in May 1520, he died soon after and the Portuguese (who were rumored to be troublemakers in Canton and supposedly even cannibalized kidnapped Chinese children), were ejected by Chinese authorities under the new Grand Secretary Yang Tinghe. Although illegal trade continued thereafter, official relations between the Portuguese and the Ming court would not improve until the 1540s, culminating in the Ming court's consent in 1557 to Portugal establishing Macau as their trading base in China.

Sino-Malay alliance against Portugal
The Malay Malacca Sultanate was a tributary state and ally to Ming China. When Portugal conquered Malacca in 1511 and committed atrocities against the Malay Sultanate, the Ming responded with violent force against Portugal.

Due to the complaint that the Malaccan Sultan had lodged with the Zhengde emperor against the Portuguese invasion, the Portuguese were greeted with hostility from the Chinese when they arrived in China. The Malaccan Sultan, based in Bintan after fleeing Malacca, sent a message to the Ming, which combined with Portuguese raids and piracy in China, led the Ming authorities to arrest and execute 23 of the Portuguese and torture the rest. After the Portuguese set up posts for trading in China and committed piratical activities and raids in China, the Ming responded with the complete extermination of the Portuguese in Ningbo and Quanzhou. The Ming government imprisoned, tortured and executed multiple Portuguese envoys in Guangzhou, after the Malaccans informed the Chinese of the Portuguese seizure of Malacca, to which the Chinese responded with hostility toward the Portuguese. The Malaccans told the Chinese of the Portuguese deception in disguising plans for conquering Malacca as mere trading activities, and told of all the atrocities committed by the Portuguese. Pires, a Portuguese trade envoy, was accused of spying and was among those who died in the Chinese dungeons. The Ming effectively held the Portuguese ambassador hostage, using them as a bargaining chip in demanding that the Portuguese restore the deposed Malaccan Sultan to his throne.

The Ming defeated a Portuguese fleet in 1521 at the Battle of Tunmen, killing and capturing so many Portuguese that the Portuguese had to abandon their junks and retreat with only three ships, only escaping back to Malacca because a wind scattered the Chinese ships as they launched a final attack.

The Ming proceeded to execute several Portuguese by beating and strangling them, and torturing the rest. The other Portuguese prisoners were put into iron chains and kept in prison. The Chinese confiscated all of the Portuguese property and goods in the Pires embassy's possession.

In 1522 Martim Afonso de Merlo Coutinho was appointed commander of another Portuguese fleet sent to establish diplomatic relations. The Chinese defeated the Portuguese ships led by Coutinho at the Battle of Shancaowan. A large number of Portuguese were captured and ships destroyed during the battle. The Portuguese were forced to retreat to Malacca.

The Ming forced Pires to write letters for them, demanding that the Portuguese restore the deposed Malaccan Sultan back to his throne. The Malay ambassador to China was to deliver the letter.

The Ming sent a message to the deposed Sultan of Malacca concerning the fate of the Portuguese ambassador, whom the Chinese held prisoner. When they received his reply, the Chinese officials then proceeded to execute the Portuguese ambassador, slicing their bodies into multiple pieces. Their genitalia were inserted into their oral cavities. Thess executions were deliberately conducted in multiple public areas in Guangzhou, to show that the Portuguese were "petty sea robbers" in the eyes of the Chinese. When more Portuguese ships landed, the Ming also had them seized, and subsequently executed  as well, cutting off their genitalia, beheading the bodies and forcing their fellow Portuguese to wear the body parts, while the Chinese celebrated with music. The genitalia and heads were displayed strung up for display in public, after which they were discarded.

Death

The Zhengde Emperor died in 1521 at age 29, 31 according to the Chinese age reckoning used at the time. It was said that he was drunk while boating on a lake one day in the fall of 1520, fell off, and almost drowned. He died after contracting illnesses from the Grand Canal waters. Since none of his several children had survived childhood, he was succeeded by his cousin Zhu Houcong, who became known as the Jiajing Emperor. His tomb is located at Kangling of the Ming tombs.

Legacy

By the accounts of some historians, although bred to be a successful ruler, the Zhengde Emperor thoroughly neglected his duties, beginning a dangerous trend that would plague future Ming emperors. The abandonment of official duties to pursue personal gratification would slowly lead to the rise of powerful eunuchs who would dominate and eventually ruin the Ming dynasty.
The Ming scholar Tan Qian argued that: "The Emperor was smart and playful... He also did not harm officials who argued against him. [He enjoyed] the support of the minister and the efficient works of the clerks. [He worked until] midnight to issue edicts that punished [the criminals] like Liu Jin and Qian Ning (Zhengde's own adoptive son)."

Some modern historians have come to view his reign in a new light and debate that his actions along with that of his successors such as the Wanli Emperor were a direct reaction to the bureaucratic gridlock that affected the Ming dynasty in its later half. The emperors were very limited in their policy decision and could not really implement any sort of lasting effective reforms despite the obvious need, while they were faced with constant pressure and were expected to be responsible for all the troubles the dynasty faced. As a result, the ministers became increasingly frustrated and disillusioned about their posts, and protested in different forms of what was essentially an imperial strike. Thus emperors such as the Zhengde Emperor sneaked out of the palace while emperors such as the Jiajing and Wanli emperors simply did not show up in the imperial court. Other authors state that Zhengde was a ruler with a strong will, who dealt decisively with Liu Jin, Prince Ning, Prince Anhua and the Mongol threat, acted competently in crises caused by natural disasters and plagues and collected taxes in a benevolent manner. Although his reign's achievements were in large parts the contributions of his very talented officials, they also reflected on the capability of the ruler.

Family
Consorts:
 Empress Xiaojingyi, of the Xia clan (1492–1535)
 Consort Shuhuide, of the Wu clan (d. 1539)
 Consort Rongshuxian, of the Shen clan (1492–1542)
 Consort, of the Wang clan
 Beauty, of the Liu clan
 Wang Mantang; 1471 – 1541)
 Lady, of the Ma clan
 Lady, of the Dai clan
 Lady, of the Du clan

Ancestry

Cultural references
 In the 1959 film Kingdom and the Beauty (江山美人), the Zhengde Emperor (portrayed by Zhao Lei (actor) disguises himself as a regular commoner among the people.
 Facets of Love, also known as Northern Ladies of China (北地胭脂), a 1973 film directed by Li Han-hsiang, tells three brothel-themed stories set in different time periods, one of them about Emperor Zhengde.
 The Hong Kong film Chinese Odyssey 2002 (天下無雙) is loosely based on a story of one of the Zhengde Emperor's tours in Zhejiang province in which Zhengde is portrayed by Chang Chen.
 In the 2005 television show Zhengde Commentary (正德演義), the Zhengde Emperor was portrayed by television variety show host He Jiong.
 The Zhengde Emperor is portrayed by Nicky Law in the 2009 TVB drama A Bride for a Ride based on a traditional Pingtan opera of the same name.

See also
 Family tree of Chinese monarchs (late)
 Zhengde Tongbao

References

 
 
 
 
 
 
 Oriental Blue and White, London, 1970, p. 29.
 
 
 
 
 
 
 
 
 
 
 
 

1491 births
1521 deaths
Accidental deaths in China
16th-century Chinese monarchs
16th-century LGBT people
Child monarchs from Asia
LGBT heads of state
Chinese LGBT people
LGBT royalty
Ming dynasty emperors
People from Beijing